Vladyslav Hennadiyovych Sharay (born 25 May 1997) is a Ukrainian professional footballer who plays as a left winger for Veres Rivne.

Career
Sharay is a product of the FC Knyazha Schaslyve Youth Sportive School System.

He signed contract with FC Olimpik Donetsk in summer 2015 and played in the Ukrainian Premier League Reserves. In July 2017 he went on loan and made his debut for FC Avanhard Kramatorsk in the Ukrainian First League in a match against FC Inhulets Petrove on 15 July 2017.

On 9 July 2022 he signed for Veres Rivne.

Personal life 
He is the twin brother of Stanislav Sharay who is also a footballer.

References

External links
 
 

1997 births
Living people
People from Romny
Ukrainian footballers
Association football forwards
FC Olimpik Donetsk players
FC Kramatorsk players
PFC Sumy players
FC Alians Lypova Dolyna players
FC Inhulets Petrove players
NK Veres Rivne players
Ukrainian Premier League players
Ukrainian First League players
Ukrainian Second League players
Ukrainian Amateur Football Championship players
Ukrainian twins
Twin sportspeople
Sportspeople from Sumy Oblast